Grammothele is a genus of poroid crust fungi in the family Polyporaceae.

Taxonomy
Circumscribed by mycologists Miles Joseph Berkeley and Moses Ashley Curtis in 1868, they considered the genus to combine the characteristics of Hymenogramme and Grandinia.

Grammothele originally contained four species: G. polygramma, G. grisea, G. mappa, and the type, G. lineata. Modern taxonomic opinion now considers the first three of these to be synonymous with the latter.

Species
, Index Fungorum accepts 19 species of Grammothele:
Grammothele africana Ipulet & Ryvarden (2005) – Uganda
Grammothele bambusicola Ryvarden (1984) – Nepal
Grammothele boliviana Karasiński (2015) – Bolivia
Grammothele brasilensis Ryvarden (2015) – Brazil
Grammothele ceracea Rick (1938)
Grammothele crocicreas (Ces.) Lloyd (1923)
Grammothele crocistroma Lloyd (1924)
Grammothele delicatula (Henn.) Ryvarden (1980) – China
Grammothele denticulata Y.C.Dai & L.W.Zhou (2012) – China
Grammothele effusoreflexa S.Banerjee (1936) – India
Grammothele fuligo (Berk. & Broome) Ryvarden (1979)
Grammothele glauca (Cooke) P.Roberts (2009)
Grammothele hainanensis F.Wu & L.W.Zhou (2016) – China
Grammothele lacticolor Ryvarden (2015) – United States
Grammothele lineata Berk. & M.A.Curtis (1868)
Grammothele macrospora Ryvarden (1980)
Grammothele ochracea Ryvarden (1982) – Thailand
Grammothele pseudomappa P.H.B.Talbot (1951)
Grammothele pulchella (Bres.) Ryvarden (1988)
Grammothele quercina (Y.C.Dai) B.K.Cui & Hai J.Li (2013) – China
Grammothele subargentea (Speg.) Rajchenb. (1983)
Grammothele venezuelica Ryvarden (2015) – Venezuela

References

 
Polyporales genera
Taxa described in 1868
Taxa named by Miles Joseph Berkeley